Frederick William Swarbrook (born 17 December 1950) is a former English cricketer who played first-class cricket for Derbyshire from 1967 to 1979 and for Griqualand West from 1972/73 to 1987/88.

Swarbrook was born at Derby and began playing for Derbyshire second and other teams in 1965. His first-class  debut came in the 1967 season, against Cambridge University, and he made his County Championship debut the following season against Worcestershire. Bowling tightly, he took two wickets for just ten runs in his first bowling stint for the team. He continued to play consistently through to 1971, before being snapped up to play in the southern hemisphere for Griqualand West. The team, however, finished bottom of the Section B table in 1972/73, and within three months Swarbrook was back playing for Derbyshire. He continued in the Currie Cup until 1976, after which he became a fixture in the Derbyshire first team. He played for Derbyshire during a Pakistani tour of England in 1977, and moved back to play for Orange Free State in 1980.

For the next eight years, he stayed in South Africa, completing his stint at Orange before moving to Griqualand West, where he played until 1988. He is the cricket coach at Grey High School in Port Elizabeth.

He was a left-handed batsman and a left-arm slow bowler. While at Derbyshire, Swarbrook remained a lower-order batsman and a strong bowler. Swarbrook hit two ten-wicket matches during his Derbyshire career, once against Oxford University and once against Sussex, taking a match-best 13/62.

References

1950 births
English cricketers
Living people
Free State cricketers
Griqualand West cricketers
Derbyshire cricketers
Cricketers from Derby